Pedro Leopoldo is a Brazilian municipality in the state of Minas Gerais. The city is located in the  Greater Belo Horizonte region. As of 2020, the estimated population was 94,712.  The city is birthplace to prominent medium Chico Xavier and 1970 World Champion and Cruzeiro footballer Dirceu Lopes.

The municipality contains 44% of the  Sumidouro State Park, created in 1980.
The Casa Fernão Dias is in the Quinta do Sumidouro district of Pedro Leopoldo.
It is listed by the State Institute of Historic and Artistic Heritage (IEPHA) as a cultural heritage monument.
It contain exhibits that tell the history of  Fernão Dias, a bandeirante who spent several years in the region with his followers in search of gold and precious stones.
The house contains an annex where the state park's administrative staff work.

See also
 List of municipalities in Minas Gerais

References

Municipalities in Minas Gerais